Dastgerd is a village in Zalaqi-ye Sharqi Rural District, Besharat District, Aligudarz County, Lorestan Province, Iran. At the 2006 census, its population was 253, in 46 families.

References 

Towns and villages in Aligudarz County